Calef is a surname. Notable people with the surname include:

John Haskell Calef (1841–1912), American artillery officer
Nancy Calef, American figurative painter, illustrator and author
Robert Calef (baptized 1648–1719), English cloth merchant in colonial America

See also
Dr. John Calef House